IRAS 12063-6259 is a compact H II region in the constellation of Crux. It lies at a heliocentric distance of roughly 9.5 kpc and a galactocentric distance of 9.3 kpc. Although previously classified as a planetary nebula as well as an H II region, this source is now solely classified as a normal compact H II region, due to its colour criteria, its infrared luminosity, and its spectral content.

Radio observations from the Australia Telescope Compact Array (ATCA) reveal IRAS 12063-6259 to consist of a compact object roughly 16"x7" which is embedded in a low brightness region 28"x25". The compact region contains two compact objects at 4.8 GHz, labelled Radio A and Radio B, while at higher frequencies (8.6 GHz) Radio B is further resolved into subcomponents B1 and B2. This complex substructure points towards the presence of multiple ionising stars rather than a single star.

References

External links

H II regions
Crux (constellation)